Viktor Nikolayevich Kudriavtsev (born 24 October 1937 in Tula, Russia) is a Russian figure skating coach and choreographer.

Career 
Kudriavtsev began skating at age 16 and turned to coaching at 22. His first notable student was Sergey Volkov who excelled at compulsory figures and was the first Soviet skater to win the men's World title. Other students include the 1998 Olympic champion Ilia Kulik, Elena Sokolova, Ilia Klimkin, Victoria Volchkova, Alexander Shubin, Andrejs Vlascenko, and Evan Lysacek. Although a singles coach, Kudriavtsev has also worked with a few pairs, including Lyudmila Smirnova / Andrei Suraikin.

Early in his coaching career, Kudriavtsev worked at a rink in Sokolniki, then at Kristal in Luzhniki, followed by Olimpiyski, and finally Moskvich. He is retired from coaching but remains a consultant. He runs summer training camps in Moscow and in Films, Switzerland and many international skaters, including Stéphane Lambiel, Lina Johansson, Oscar Peter and Jamal Othman, have trained under him there. He has choreographed for the Ice Theatre of New York.

In 2014, he returned to coach Michael Christian Martinez, the first figure skater in a tropical zone for the 2014 Winter Olympics.

Personal life 
Viktor Kudriavtsev is married to Marina Kudriavtseva with whom he has a son.

References

Russian figure skating coaches
Living people
1937 births
People from Tula, Russia
Soviet figure skating coaches
Recipients of the Order of Honour (Russia)
Merited Coaches of the Soviet Union
Honoured Coaches of Russia